Bab al-Mandab District also known as Dhubab District is a district of the Taiz Governorate, Yemen. As of 2003, the district had a population of 35,054 inhabitants. The principal town is Dhubab.

References

Districts of Taiz Governorate